Dr. Rifaat Hussain (born April 1, 1952) is a Pakistani political scientist, professor, defense analyst and television personality whose career in the academia spans over four decades. Hussain served as the executive director of the Regional Centre for Strategic Studies (RCSS) from 2005 to 2008, a Colombo-based think tank in Sri Lanka, and spent two terms as visiting professor at Stanford University’s Center for International Security and Cooperation (CISAC). The New York Times Magazine has described Hussain as a "leading Pakistani foreign policy thinker."

Hussain's work has appeared in The Washington Post, The New York Times, and his foreign policy views have been quoted by The Wall Street Journal, Reuters, The Guardian, Bloomberg, CNN, TIME, and The Atlantic.

Both The Economist and the BBC have interviewed Hussain on issues pertaining to South Asian security, including the Kashmir conflict, U.S. involvement in Afghanistan, Pakistan's counter-terrorism efforts, NATO and India-Pakistan engagement. Carnegie Endowment for International Peace, The Stimson Center and The Atlantic Council cite Hussain's insights as part of their published compilations and reports.

Dr. Hussain has held associations with Quaid-i-Azam University for 36 years, and has also headed the Department of Government Policy and Public Administration at the National University of Sciences and Technology, a top-ranked public research university in Pakistan.

He is one of 18 members on the Advisory Committee on Foreign Affairs under Prime Minister Imran Khan's government.

Current work 
Dr. Hussain is currently a professor and consultant at the Department of Government Policy and Public Administration at Pakistan's National University of Sciences and Technology.

Education 
Rifaat Hussain earned his M.A. and Ph.D. from The Josef Korbel School of International Studies, University of Denver, United States.

Selected international publications 
 "Sino-Pakistan Ties," in Thomas Fingar, Ed. The New Great Game: China and South and Central Asia in an era of Reform, (Stanford, California: Stanford University Press, 2016), 116–146..
 "Pakistan's Relations with Azad Kashmir and the impact on Indo-Pakistani Relations," in Rafiq Dossani and Henry S. Rowen, Eds. Prospects for Peace in South Asia (Stanford: Stanford University Press, 2005): 109–140..
 "Missile Race in South Asia: the way forward," South Asian Survey Vol. 11, No. 2 (July/December 2004): 273–286.
 "Democratic Transitions and the Role of Islam in Asia: Perspective from Pakistan," in Douglas E. Ramage, ed. Asian Perspectives Seminar: Democratic Transitions and the Role of Islam in Asia, October 18, 2000 (Washington, D.C.: 2000): 13–29.
 "The India Factor," in Maleeha Lodhi, ed. Pakistan: Beyond the Crisis State (London: Hurst and Company, 2011): 319–347..
 "Liberation Tigers of Tamil Eelam (LTTE): Failed Quest for a "Homeland," in Klejda Mulaj, ed. Violent Non-State Actors in World Politics (London: Hurst and Company, 2010): 381–412..
 "Pakistan's Security Policy in the 1990s with Special Reference to Relations with India, China and Central Asia," in Nobuko Nagasaki, Ed. The Nation-State and Transnational Forces in South Asia: Research Project: Institutions, Network and Forces of Changes in Contemporary South Asia (Tokyo: Japanese Ministry of Education, Science, Sports and Culture, 2001): 213–240.
 "The Superpower and Major Power Rivalry in South Asia: The United States, the Soviet Union, India and China" in Lawrence Ziring and David G. Dickson, Eds. Asian Security Issues: National Systems and International Relations (Kalamazoo: Department of Government, Michigan University, 1988: 143–163.).
 "Responding to terrorist threat: Perspectives from Saudi Arabia and Pakistan," Gulf Year Book, 2006 (Dubai: The Gulf Research Centre, 2007): 317–334..
 "Responding to terrorist threat: Perspectives from Saudi Arabia and Pakistan," Journal of South Asian and Middle Eastern Studies Vol. XXX, No. 3 (Spring 2007): 38-61(ISSN: 0149–1784).
 "Deterrence and Nuclear Use: Doctrines in South Asia," in E. Sridharan, Ed. The India-Pakistan Nuclear Relationship: Theories of Deterrence and International Relations (London and New Delhi: Rout ledge: 2007): 151–184..
 "Changing security trends in South Asia: Implications for the Gulf Region," in Abdulaziz Sager, ed. Dynamic Alliances: Strengthening Ties between GCC and Asia (Dubai: Gulf Research Centre, 2006): 77–98..

References 

1953 births
Living people